Alfredo Marcondes is a Brazilian municipality located in the state of São Paulo. The population is 4,184 (2020 est.) in an area of 119 km².

References

Municipalities in São Paulo (state)